Mathieu Faye (born 27 July 1958) is a Senegalese former basketball player. Faye competed for Senegal at the 1980 Summer Olympics, where he scored 57 points in 6 games. He was born in Dakar. He won the 1983 Korać Cup with France's  CSP Limoges basketball team.

On June 6, 2021, Faye was enshrined into the FIBA Basketball Hall of Fame.

References

1958 births
ASC Jeanne d'Arc basketball players
Living people
Basketball players at the 1980 Summer Olympics
Mathieu
FIBA Hall of Fame inductees
Limoges CSP players
Olympic basketball players of Senegal
Senegalese expatriate basketball people in France
Senegalese men's basketball players
1978 FIBA World Championship players
Basketball players from Dakar